The Brock Railroad was a wholly owned subsidiary of the Warren Car Company of Warren, PA. The business entity Brock Railroad Company was created with the Pennsylvania Department of State on February 17, 1982.

References

Defunct Pennsylvania railroads